Live With Friends is a live album by Elkie Brooks, recorded live in 2005 at Classic T-Stage Studios and released on CD in 2007 through EMP Records.

Since it was only available on tour, the album was not chart eligible.

Track listing

Disc one
"Electric Lady"
"Gasoline Alley"
"Set Me Free"
"Superstar"
"The Rose"
"Runaway"
"Fool If You Think It’s Over"
"Don’t Cry Out Loud"
"Lilac Wine"
"Nights in White Satin"
"He Moves Me"

Disc two
"The Groom's Still Waiting at the Altar"
"Try Harder"
"Roadhouse Blues"
"Baby, What Do You Want Me to Do"
"Out of the Rain"
"We’ve Got Tonight"
"Sunshine After the Rain"
"No More the Fool"
"The Brighter Side"
"Travelin’ Light"
"Pearl’s a Singer"

Personnel
Elkie Brooks – vocals
Jean Roussel – keyboards
Rick Wakeman – keyboards, synths
Geoff Whitehorn – guitar
Martin Taylor – guitar
Mike Richardson – drums
Brian Badhams – bass
Lee Noble – backing vocals, percussion
Steve Jones – saxophone
Sarah Jory – pedal steel
Humphrey Lyttelton – trumpet

Elkie Brooks albums
2007 live albums